The Washington State Treasurer is an elected constitutional officer in the executive branch of the U.S. state of Washington. Mike Pellicciotti is the current Washington State Treasurer, a Democrat who began his term in January 2021. The Treasurer's office is located in the Washington State Capitol.

Powers and duties
In Washington, the State Treasurer serves as the chief banker, financier, and investor for state government and is a key player in the day-to-day management of state finances. The State Treasurer manages the state's cash flows and local government investments which, as of 2020, totaled $350 billion. The State Treasurer is also responsible for issuing and servicing the state's $21.4 billion outstanding debt and other financial obligations. As one of 15 members on the Washington State Investment Board, the State Treasurer also directs and supervises the investment of public pension and retirement funds. 

Aside from being third (behind the Lieutenant Governor and Secretary of State, respectively) in the constitutional line of succession to the office of Governor, most of the State Treasurer's specific responsibilities are set-forth in the Revised Code of Washington. In fact, the Washington Constitution only provides that "the treasurer shall perform such duties as shall be prescribed by law," a provision similar to the earlier enacted constitution of the neighboring state of Oregon. The constitution originally directed that the Treasurer would be paid a salary of $2,000, though constitutional limits on officeholder salaries have since been repealed by amendment and are now set by statute.

Election and term of office
The Treasurer is elected every four years on a partisan ballot; any registered voter in the state of Washington is eligible to stand for election. The Washington State Constitution requires that, upon assuming office, the Treasurer establish residence in the state's capital city of Olympia. State law further requires he post a surety bond of $500,000, approved by both the Washington Secretary of State and the Chief Justice of the Washington Supreme Court.

List of Washington Treasurers 
The State of Washington has had a total of 22 Treasurers, 2 of whom (Otto A. Case and Tom Martin) served non-consecutive terms. Otto A. Case also served as Commissioner of Public Lands from 1945 to 1949 and 1953–1957.

See also
 State treasurer
 State constitutional officer (United States)

References